Dorcadion indutum is a species of beetle in the family Cerambycidae. It was described by Faldermann in 1837.

Subspecies
 Dorcadion indutum indutum Faldermann, 1837
 Dorcadion indutum nigrosuturatum Reitter, 1897

References

indutum
Beetles described in 1837